The Muri Dam is a dam in Hokkaidō, Japan, completed in 1980.

References 

Dams in Hokkaido
Dams completed in 1980